János Wass, or "Prince" John, (16th century) was an illegitimate son of King Louis II of Hungary and Bohemia, the ill-fated king, who died young and in mysterious circumstances at the Battle of Mohács, by a liaison with his mother Anne of Foix-Candale's former lady's maid, Angelitha Wass.

Life 

His and his mother's names appear in the sources of the Chamber in Pozsony (now Bratislava) as either János Wass or János Lanthos which can refer to the fact that he used his mother's name first, then that of his 'job', 'lantos' that means 'lutenist, bard'. He often titled himself as Prince.  He received regular subsidy from the court of King Ferdinand I of Germany, who was his uncle by his wife, Queen Anna Jagiellon, the sister of King Louis II and then of King Maximilian II, who was his cousin. From these financial backings he bought a house in Pozsony (now Bratislava), where he lived with family.  He died there. He was never recognized officially as the son of the king.

Family 

He had a large family; there was a rumour that a daughter of his gave birth to 20 children and he demanded extra financial backings for his daughter's wedding.

References
Kubinyi, András: Törvénytelen gyermekek a magyar középkorban. Utódok, örökösök, fattyúk (Illegitimate Children in Medieval Hungary. Offsprings, Successors, Bastards), História 21, 20–22, 1999. URL: See External Links
Takáts, Sándor: II. Lajos király fia (A Son of King Louis II Jagiellon), Századok (Periodical Centuries), 183–185, 1903.
Tardy, Lajos: Rémmesék II. Lajos és „természetes” fia körül. (Blood-freezers about King Louis Jagiellon and his 'Natural' Son In Lajos Tardy: Kis magyar történetek (Short Hungarian Stories), Budapest, 40–53, 1986.

External links
Kubinyi, András: Törvénytelen gyermekek a magyar középkorban (Illegitimate Children in Medieval Hungary) – 20. February 2011.

Jagiellonian dynasty
16th-century Hungarian people
Illegitimate children of Hungarian monarchs
Sons of kings